Earth's Greatest Spectacles (released in some countries as Seasonal Wonderlands) is a 2016 British nature documentary series created and produced by the BBC, first shown in February 2016 at BBC Two and BBC Two HD. The series takes on stunning seasonal changes based on the three locations where it reveals the dramatic process which occur for each year and showing how wildlife adapts to cope with the changes.

The series was composed by David Mitcham and narrated by Domhnall Gleeson.

Broadcast

British television
Earth's Greatest Spectacles premiered on British television on 5 February 2016, broadcast on BBC Two and BBC Two HD, which consisted of total three episodes.

International
The series was set to broadcast internationally on BBC Earth channel. It debuted in Asia on each Wednesday starting from 20 July 2016, in Nordic region on each Sunday from 14 August 2016, and in South Africa aired each Sunday from 13 November 2016.

The series premiered in Belgium on 24 March 2016 at the Canvas TV and in the Netherlands from 17 May 2016 on NPO 2.

In Japan, the series aired all three episodes on 30 September 2017 at WOWOW's BBC Earth monthly block.

As for the United States, the first episode - New England, is aired at TPT 2 on 4 November 2017.

Episodes

References

External links

2016 British television series debuts
2016 British television series endings
2010s British documentary television series
BBC television documentaries
Documentary films about nature
BBC high definition shows
English-language television shows